Haslem is a surname, a variant of Haslam, a surname originating in England.  Notable people with the surname include:

Graeme Haslem (b. 1940), Australian rules footballer
John Haslem (politician) (born 1939), Australian politician
John Haslem (artist) (1808–1884), English china and enamel painter, and writer
Thomas Haslem (fl. 1871), plaintiff in Haslem v. Lockwood
Udonis Haslem (born 1980), American basketball player

See also
Haslam (surname)

English-language surnames